The String Lake Trail is a  long hiking trail in Grand Teton National Park in the U.S. state of Wyoming. The trail circles String Lake and is also used to access the Paintbrush Canyon Trail and the Leigh Lake Trail. The String Lake trailhead is off the one-way road from North Jenny Lake Junction.

See also
 List of hiking trails in Grand Teton National Park

References

Hiking trails of Grand Teton National Park